P Is the Funk is the second installment of the George Clinton Family Series collection. The album was released in 1992 by P-Vine Records in Japan, and then was released later in the same year by AEM Records in the United States and Sequel Records in the United Kingdom. The album contains notable tracks such as the first song ever recorded by the Brides of Funkenstein entitled "Love Is Something" featuring P-Funk lead guitarist Eddie Hazel, as well radio commercials for the Ultra Wave album by Bootsy Collins.

As with all of the Family Series CD's, George Clinton supplies background information of all of the songs featured on the CD (Track 11)

Track listing and personnel

Clone Communicado

Artist: Funkadelic (1976)  Producer: George Clinton
Drums: Tiki Fulwood
Guitar: Garry Shider, Glen Goins, Michael Hampton, Eddie Hazel
Keyboard: Bernie Worrell
Vocals: Dr. Funkenstein (Archie Ivy), Ron Ford, Funkadelic

Does Disc Go with D.A.T. (Simon Says)

Artist: Parliament (1979)  Producer: George Clinton, Ron Dunbar
Drums: Dennis Chambers
Bass: Donnie Sterling
Guitar: Gordon Carlton
Clavinet: Bernie Worrell
Horns: Horny Horns
Vocals: Lonnie Greene, Ron Dunbar, Donnie Sterling
Background Vocals: Parliament, Brides, Parlet

Shove On

Artist: Jimmy G (1981)  Producer: George Clinton, Ron Ford
Drums: Dean Ragland
Bass: Jimmy Giles
Guitar: Ron Ford
Piano: David Lee Chong
Fender Rhodes: David Lee Chong
Lead Vocals: Jimmy Giles
Background Vocals: Parlet, Ron Ford

Rock Jam

Artist: Ron Ford (1980)  Producer: Ron Ford, George Clinton
Background Vocals: Brides, Parlet
Drums: Dean Ragland
Guitar, Bass: Ron Ford
Keyboards: David Spradley

Love Is Something

Artist: Brides of Funkenstein (1977)  Producer: George Clinton
Drums: Tiki Fulwood
Bass: Billy "Bass" Nelson
Guitar: Jim Callon, Eddie Hazel
Clavinet, Synth: Bernie Worrell
Vocals: Eddie Hazel, Brides of Funkenstein, Jim Callon
Sax Solo: Darryl Dixon

Every Booty (Get On Down)
Artist: Parliament (1979)  Producer: Bootsy Collins, George Clinton
Drums: Frankie Waddy
Bass: Bootsy Collins
Guitar: Bootsy Collins, Michael Hampton
Keyboards: Bernie Worrell, Mudbone Cooper
Clavinet, Organ: Maceo Parker
Horns: Horny Horns
Percussion: Larry Fratangelo
Vocals: Funkadelic

Personal Problems

Artist: Treylewd (1981)  Producer: George Clinton
Drums: Tony Davis
Bass: Stevie Pannall
Guitars: Andre Williams
Vocals: Tracey Lewis, Andre "Foxxe" Williams

Bubble Gum Gangster

Artist: Ron Ford (1981)  Producer: Ron Ford, George Clinton
Drums: Man In The Box
Bass: Ron Ford
Keyboards: David Spradley
Guitars: Ron Ford
Background Vocal: Brides, Parlet

She's Crazy

Artist: Jerome & Jimmy Ali (1980) 
Guitars: Jerome Ali
Bass: Jimmy Ali
Drums: Dennis Chambers

Think Right

Artist: Parlet & Brides of Funkenstein (1980)  Producer: Ron Ford, George Clinton
Drums: Kenny Colton
Guitar: Tony Thomas, Michael Hampton
Keyboards: Nestro Wilson
Bass: Ron Ford
Vocals: Parlet

In the Cabin of My Uncle Jam (P Is the Funk)

Artist: Funkadelic (1979)  Producer: George Clinton
Drums: Kenny Colton
Bass: Jeff "Cherokee" Bunn
Guitars: Kevin Oliver, Garry Shider, Michael Hampton, Glen Goins, Eddie Hazel
Keyboards: Gary Hudgins, Bernie Worrell
Vocals: Ron Ford, Dr. Funkenstein, Archie Ivey, Nene

My Love
Artist: Jessica Cleaves (1981)  Producer: George Clinton, Ron Dunbar
Vocals: Jessica Cleaves

Interview
The Family

Commercials
George Clinton
Bootsy Collins

George Clinton (funk musician) albums
1993 albums